The Thai League Cup is a knock-out football tournament played in Thai sport. Some games are played as a single match, others are played as two-legged contests. The 2016 Thai League Cup kicked off on  6 February 2016 . The Thai League Cup has been readmitted back into Thai football after a 10-year absence. The Thai League Cup is sponsored by Toyota thus naming it Toyota League Cup. The prize money for this prestigious award is said to be around 5 million baht and the runners-up will be netting 1 million baht.

The prize money is not the only benefit of this cup, the team winning the fair play spot will get a Hilux Vigo. The MVP of the competition will get a Toyota Camry Hybrid Car. The winner of the cup will earn the right to participate on a cup competition in Japan.

This was the first edition of the competition and the qualifying round was played in regions featuring clubs from the Regional League Division 2.

Following the death of King Bhumibol Adulyadej, the Football Association of Thailand cancelled the remaining league and cup season on 14 October 2016, stating that the League Cup winners would be determined by a lottery draw. This was when only the final was required to be played and would determine who would represent Thailand in the Mekong Club Championship.

The following day however (15 October), FAT appeared to do a U-turn and announced that further discussions with key stake holders would determine whether the league campaign would continue. These discussions were required as teams that were in the relegation places at the time of the original announcement were voicing their concerns.

On the 16 October, after a meeting of all top flight league clubs it was announced that the original decision to cancel the remaining games would stay in place, therefore crowning Muangthong United and Buriram United as joint champions.

Calendar

1st Qualification Round

Northern Region 
The qualifying round was in regions featuring clubs from the 2016 Thai Division 2 League Northern Region

North Eastern Region 
The qualifying round was in regions featuring clubs from the 2016 Thai Division 2 League North Eastern Region

Central Region 
The qualifying round was played in regions featuring clubs from the 2016 Thai Division 2 League Central Region

Eastern Region 
The qualifying round was played in regions featuring clubs from the 2016 Thai Division 2 League Eastern Region

Western Region 
The qualifying round was played in regions featuring clubs from the 2016 Thai Division 2 League Western Region

Bangkok & Eastern Region 
The qualifying round was played in regions featuring clubs from the 2016 Thai Division 2 League Bangkok & Eastern Region

Bangkok & field Region 
The qualifying round was played in regions featuring clubs from the 2016 Thai Division 2 League Bangkok & field Region

Southern Region 
The qualifying round was played in regions featuring clubs from the 2016 Thai Division 2 League Southern Region

2nd Qualification Round

Northern Region 
The qualifying round was played in regions featuring clubs from the 2016 Thai Division 2 League Northern Region

Central Region 
The qualifying round was played in regions featuring clubs from the 2016 Thai Division 2 League Central Region

Eastern Region 
The qualifying round was played in regions featuring clubs from the 2016 Thai Division 2 League Eastern Region

Western Region 
The qualifying round was played in regions featuring clubs from the 2016 Thai Division 2 League Western Region

Bangkok & Eastern Region 
The qualifying round was played in regions featuring clubs from the 2016 Thai Division 2 League Bangkok & Eastern Region

Bangkok & field Region 
The qualifying round was played in regions featuring clubs from the 2016 Thai Division 2 League Bangkok & field Region

Southern Region 
The qualifying round was played in regions featuring clubs from the 2016 Thai Division 2 League Southern Region

First round

Second round

Third round

Quarter-finals

Semi-finals 

|-
|}

1st leg

2nd leg

Final

See also 
 2016 Thai League
 2016 Thai Division 1 League
 2016 Regional League Division 2
 2016 Football Division 3
 2016 Thai FA Cup
 2016 Kor Royal Cup

Sources 
 https://web.archive.org/web/20160129105719/http://www.siamsport.co.th/Sport_Football/160128_157.html
 http://www.thailandsusu.com/webboard/index.php?topic=366833.0
 http://www.thailandsusu.com/webboard/index.php?topic=367016.0
 http://www.thailandsusu.com/webboard/index.php?topic=367248.0
 http://www.thailandsusu.com/webboard/index.php?topic=367380.0
 http://www.thailandsusu.com/webboard/index.php?topic=367904.0
 http://www.smmsport.com/reader.php?news=174851
 http://www.smmsport.com/reader.php?news=175364
 http://www.thailandsusu.com/webboard/index.php?topic=369024.0
 http://www.thailandsusu.com/webboard/index.php?topic=369447.0
 http://www.smmsport.com/reader.php?news=176228
 http://www.smmsport.com/reader.php?news=176467
 http://www.thailandsusu.com/webboard/index.php?topic=369755.0
 http://www.thailandsusu.com/webboard/index.php?topic=369856.0
 http://www.thailandsusu.com/webboard/index.php?topic=369895.0
 https://www.facebook.com/ToyotaFootball/photos/a.1674807752800594.1073741828.1674194092861960/1705696179711751/?type=3&theater
 http://www.thailandsusu.com/webboard/index.php?topic=371774.0
 http://www.thailandsusu.com/webboard/index.php?topic=371881.0
 http://www.thailandsusu.com/webboard/index.php?topic=372762.0
 http://www.smmsport.com/reader.php?news=182049
 http://www.thailandsusu.com/webboard/index.php?topic=374286.0
 http://www.thailandsusu.com/webboard/index.php?topic=374315.0
 http://www.thailandsusu.com/webboard/index.php?topic=374462.0
 http://www.thailandsusu.com/webboard/index.php?topic=375645.0

References

External links 
 Official Tournament

2016 in Thai football cups
Thailand League Cup
2016
2016